Speed Metal Symphony is the first studio album by the American heavy metal band Cacophony, released in 1987 through Shrapnel Records.

Critical reception

In a contemporary review, Frank Trojan of Rock Hard magazine found Speed Metal Symphony "much harder and faster" than the works of Tony MacAlpine, Vinnie Moore or Yngwie Malmsteen, "which means that some tracks are speed kills with super solos". He added that, although "the pure instrumentals are, unfortunately, again the usual mixtures of classic elements and endless revival on well-known riffs and standards, Cacophony could appeal to a bigger circle by their rough, and sometimes also partly speedy way of playing, than just pure guitar freaks." The album was re-released on CD in 1991.

Andy Hinds at AllMusic called Speed Metal Symphony "tough to digest". He noted its technical complexity and lack of production quality, while suggesting that it is "some of the most indulgent music ever recorded." Praise was nevertheless given to the skill of guitarists Jason Becker and Marty Friedman, though Hinds suggested that both their subsequent solo releases (Perpetual Burn and Dragon's Kiss, respectively) were superior. Canadian journalist Martin Popoff defined the album "an expertly played, mostly instrumental affair" and "a slightly less arch and arcane version of Yngwie's debut", criticising Peter Marrino's vocals "buried in the mix" and not "up to standards" of the other musicians.

In 2009, Guitar World magazine ranked the album ninth on its list of the all-time top ten shred albums.

Track listing

Personnel
Cacophony
Peter Marrino – vocals
Marty Friedman – lead and rhythm guitars, bass, producer
Jason Becker – lead and rhythm guitars
Atma Anur – drums

Production
Steve Fontano – engineer
Dino Alden – assistant engineer
George Horn – mastering at Fantasy Studios, Berkeley, California
Mike Varney – executive producer

References

External links
Story Behind The Song - Cacophony's Speed Metal Symphony at martyfriedman.com
In Review: Cacophony "Speed Metal Symphony" at Guitar Nine Records

Cacophony (band) albums
Jason Becker albums
Marty Friedman albums
1987 debut albums
Shrapnel Records albums
Albums produced by Mike Varney